Momir of Lučica (1804–13) was a Serbian Revolutionary commander who participated in the First Serbian Uprising (1804–13).

He was born in Lučica, at that time part of the Požarevac nahiya in the Sanjak of Smederevo ("Belgrade Pashaluk").

He was a knez before the uprising. He joined the uprising at the beginning, in 1804, and rallied people in the Morava and Stig regions. He participated in the Siege of Požarevac (1804), besieging the town from Morava to Salakovac. His trench was situated in Gornja Mala. Momir and Milenko Stojković cleansed the southern part of the Požarevac district from Ottomans. After the liberation of Požarevac, Karađorđe appointed him the knez of Morava (Moravska knežina).

Paulj Matejić begged for the hand of Momir's daughter for his son Budimir, and they married.

Momir had a mansion in Lučica, fenced by palisade.

His son Ivo Momirović (fl. 1812–13) was a vojvoda.

Momir is regarded the third, after Milenko Stojković and Petar Dobrnjac, most important revolutionary in the First Serbian Uprising from the Požarevac area, based on courage, reputation and participation.

See also
 List of Serbian Revolutionaries

References

Sources
 
  
 
 
 

19th-century Serbian people
Serbian revolutionaries
People of the First Serbian Uprising
Military personnel from Požarevac
Serbian military leaders